Baza may refer to:
 Baza, Granada, a town and municipality in Granada, Spain
 CD Baza, a football team from the city
 Baza, Perm Krai, a rural locality in Perm Krai, Russia
 Bazas or Aviceda,  genus of bird of prey in the family Accipitridae (hawks)
 Belarusan-American Association (BAZA)

See also
 Hoya of Baza, a valley in the northern part of the province of Granada, Andalusia, Spain
 Sierra de Baza, a mountain range near to and named after Baza, Granada
Baza PMS-113 railway station, a railway station in Russia